Jon Hamilton is a journalist
 and is the science correspondent for NPR.

Hamilton is an English graduate from Oberlin College. He received his Master's Degree in journalism at Columbia University. He was a media fellow at the Henry J. Kaiser Family Foundation where he delivered a project on state Medicaid programs and privatization.

He began his professional career as a medical reporter for The Commercial Appeal and Physicians' Weekly and then worked as a freelance journalist and writer from 1995-1997

Awards
Hamilton has won a Baker Prize for magazine writing and a Sherwood Traveling Fellowship.

References

Year of birth missing (living people)
Living people
Oberlin College alumni
Columbia University Graduate School of Journalism alumni
NPR personalities
Place of birth missing (living people)
American male journalists
20th-century American journalists
21st-century American journalists